Bantu Mzwakali (born 9 November 1993) is a South African football midfielder for Swedish club Superettan club IK Brage.

Career

Mzwakali started his career with Ajax Cape Town.

He hails from Gugulethu on the Cape Flats.

IK Brage
On 23 January 2020, Mzwakali joined Swedish Superettan club IK Brage on a one-year deal.

References

External links

 "Bantu Mzwakali Fact File"

1993 births
Living people
Soccer players from Cape Town
South African soccer players
South African expatriate soccer players
Association football midfielders
Cape Town Spurs F.C. players
Chippa United F.C. players
Bidvest Wits F.C. players
Cape Umoya United F.C. players
IK Brage players
South African Premier Division players
National First Division players
South African expatriate sportspeople in Sweden
Expatriate footballers in Sweden